John "Jocky" Petrie (21 June 1867 – 13 July 1932) was a Scottish footballer who played for Arbroath. He holds the record for the most goals ever scored in a senior British football game with 13 goals.

Career
Petrie signed for Arbroath from local club Strathmore. On 12 September 1885, Petrie, at the age of 18, scored 13 times for Arbroath in a record 36–0 win over Bon Accord. In 1891, Petrie signed for Distillery, playing in the Irish League for a season, before returning to Arbroath. In 1920, Petrie retired from football, later becoming a kitman and trainer for Arbroath.

Aftermath
At an international level, his record was not equaled until 2001 by Archie Thompson who scored 13 goals for Australia in a 31–0 win over American Samoa.

In 2017, Petrie was inducted into Arbroath's hall of fame.

References

Scottish footballers
Arbroath F.C. players
1867 births
1932 deaths
People from Arbroath
Lisburn Distillery F.C. players
Association football forwards
Association football wingers
Association football coaches